Lugar Boswell Thistle Football Club are a Scottish football club, based in the village of Lugar, near Cumnock, Ayrshire. Their home ground since 1882 is Rosebank Park, and they wear maroon and light blue strips.

History
Formed in 1878 as Lugar Boswell, the club were originally a Senior side playing such currently distinguished names as Rangers and Heart of Midlothian. The club made nine consecutive Scottish Cup appearances in the 1880s and reached the fifth round of the competition in 1882–83, losing to eventual finalists Vale of Leven. In March 1883, they recorded a 10–2 victory over Hearts which remains the Edinburgh club's record defeat. The following season, forward Sam Thomson was capped twice for Scotland.  As success faded, the club then flitted between various Senior, Junior and even Juvenile leagues up to the Second World War. On reforming after hostilities, the club added the suffix Thistle and settled in Ayrshire Junior football.

The Jaggy Bunnets as they are nicknamed enjoyed a successful period in the 1950s. The club reached the semi-final of the Scottish Junior Cup in 1952, losing to Kilbirnie Ladeside after a replay with one tie attracting a then record attendance of over 30,000 to Rugby Park, Kilmarnock. In 1956, the club made it all the way to the final, with Thistle losing 4–1 to Petershill at Hampden Park in front of a crowd of 64,702. The current population of Lugar is 221.

With the club in danger of folding in 2015, Lugar entered a partnership with the Ayr United Football Academy where the SPFL club provided coaching staff and gave Ayr's pro-youth players game time in an adult footballing environment. In March 2016, Lugar announced that this arrangement would not continue beyond the end of the 2015–16 season and the club appointed Derek McMurdo as their new manager in the summer of 2016.

Notable former players

John Auld - Scottish International, who later played for Sunderland (1890–1895) and Newcastle United (1896–1897). 
Sam Thomson - Two caps for Scotland in 1884. Later played for Rangers and was a member of the famous "Invincibles" at Preston North End.
Andy Kerr - Partick Thistle, Kilmarnock and Scotland.
Jimmy Collins - Scottish Junior international. Played for Tottenham Hotspur and Brighton.
Bertie Black - Scottish Football League champion with Kilmarnock in 1964–65 and Scottish League international.
Joe Mason - Rangers and Greenock Morton player.

Honours

Scottish Junior Cup
Runners-up: 1955–56

Other Honours
Western League champions: 1953–54, 1955–56
Ayrshire Second Division winners: 1995–96, 1999–2000
Ayrshire (Ardrossan & Saltcoats Herald) Cup winners: 1927–28, 1928–29
Ayrshire District (Irvine Times) Cup winners: 1929–30, 1948–49
Ayrshire District League winners: 2002–03

References

External links

Football clubs in Scotland
Scottish Junior Football Association clubs
Association football clubs established in 1878
Football in East Ayrshire
1878 establishments in Scotland
South of Scotland Football League teams
West of Scotland Football League teams